Ramya Raj, alias Ragini, is a Malaysian actress, who has appeared in Tamil films.

Career 
She is probably best known for her performances in Sandai. Ramya is related to actress Khushbu, by her elder sister being Kushboo's sister-in-law. The relationship helped Ramya to debut opposite Sundar C, Kushboo's husband. Regarding her performance in Naanayam, a critic states that "Ramya Raj has more than one role to play, and does justice to it".

Filmography

References

External links
 Actress Ramya Raj Official Site

Living people
Year of birth missing (living people)
Malaysian film actresses
Malaysian people of Indian descent
Malaysian people of Tamil descent
Malaysian expatriate actresses in India
Actresses in Tamil cinema
Actresses in Malayalam cinema
21st-century Malaysian actresses